Moths of the United Arab Emirates represent about 220 known moth species. The moths (mostly nocturnal) and butterflies (mostly diurnal) together make up the taxonomic order Lepidoptera.

This is a list of moth species which have been recorded from the United Arab Emirates.

Autostichidae
Turatia iranica Gozmány, 2000

Batrachedridae
Batrachedra amydraula Meyrick, 1916

Brachodidae
Nigilgia superbella (Rebel, 1907)

Choreutidae
Choreutis aegyptiaca (Zeller, 1867)

Coleophoridae
Coleophora albidorsella Toll, 1942
Coleophora eilatica Baldizzone, 1994
Coleophora fulgidella Too & Amsel, 1967
Coleophora gymnocarpella Walsingham, 1907
Coleophora jerusalemella Toll, 1942
Coleophora lasloella Baldizzone, 1982
Coleophora mausolella Chrétien, 1908
Coleophora niphomesta Meyrick, 1917
Coleophora nurmahal Toll, 1957
Coleophora safadella van der Wolf, 2008
Coleophora sudanella Rebel, 1916
Coleophora versurella Zeller, 1849
Coleophora viettella Toll, 1956
Neoblastobasis eurotella Adamski, 2010

Cosmopterigidae
Alloclita cerritella (Riedl, 1993)
Alloclita delozona Meyrick, 1919
Anatrachyntis simplex (Walsingham, 1891)
Anatrachyntis vanharteni Koster, 2010
Ascalenia callynella Kasy, 1968
Ascalenia kairaella Kasy, 1969
Bifascioides leucomelanella (Rebel, 1917)
Coccidiphila nivea Koster, 2010
Cosmopterix crassicervicella Chrétien, 1896
Eteobalea sumptuosella (Lederer, 1855)
Gisilia gielisi Koster, 2010
Gisilia sclerodes (Meyrick, 1909)
Pseudascalenia riadella Kasy, 1968
Pyroderces argentata Koster, 2010
Pyroderces wolschrijni Koster & Sinev, 2003

Crambidae
Achyra ochrifascialis (Christoph, 1877)
Aeschremon desertalis Asselbergs, 2008
Aeschremon ochrealis Asselbergs, 2008
Aeschremon similis Asselbergs, 2008
Amselia heringi (Amsel, 1935)
Ancylolomia micropalpella Amsel, 1951
Antigastra catalaunalis (Duponchel, 1833)
Autocharis fessalis (Swinhoe, 1886)
Cnaphalocrocis poeyalis (Boisduval, 1833)
Diaphana indica (Saunders, 1851)
Duponchelia fovealis Zeller, 1847
Emprepes flavomarginalis (Amsel, 1951)
Epimetasia rufoarenalis (Rothschild, 1913)
Euchromius ocellea (Haworth, 1811)
Euchromius vinculellus (Zeller, 1847)
Euclasta mirabilis Amsel, 1949
Eurrhyparodes tricoloralis (Zeller, 1852)
Evergestis desertalis (Hübner, 1813)
Evergestis laristanalis Amsel, 1961
Harpadispar diffusalis (Guenée, 1854)
Heliothela ophideresana (Walker, 1863)
Hellula undalis (Fabricius, 1781)
Herpetogramma licarsisalis (Walker, 1859)
Hymenoptychis sordida Zeller, 1852
Leucinodes orbonalis Guenée, 1854
Maruca vitrata (Fabricius, 1787)
Nomophila noctuella ([Denis & Schiffermüller], 1775)
Noorda blitealis Walker, 1859
Palepicorsia ustrinalis (Christoph, 1877)
Pediasia numidellus (Rebel, 1903)
Piletocera opacalis Rebel, 1927
Prionapteryx soudanensis (Hampson, 1919)
Prionapteryx strioliger Rothschild, 1913
Prochoristis rupicapralis (Lederer, 1855)
Pyrausta panopealis (Walker, 1859)
Spoladea recurvalis (Fabricius, 1775)
Stiphrometasia monialis (Erschoff, 1872)
Synclera traducalis (Zeller, 1852)
Tegostoma comparalis (Hübner, 1796)

Elachistidae
Elachista densa Parenti, 1981
Elachista veruta Kaila, 2008
Ethmia alba (Amsel, 1949)
Ethmia lecmima (Sattler, 1967)
Ethmia lepidella (Chrétien, 1907)
Ethmia quadrinotella (Mann, 1861)

Geometridae
Brachyglossina sciasmatica Brandt, 1941
Cleora nana Hausmann & Skou, 2008
Eupithecia mekrana Brandt, 1941
Eupithecia ultimaria Boisduval, 1840
Glossotrophia gracilis (Brandt, 1941)
Hemidromodes sabulifera Prout, 1922
Hemithea punctifimbria Warren, 1896
Hyperythra swinhoei Butler, 1880
Idaea eremica (Brandt, 1941)
Idaea granulosa (Warren & Rothschild, 1905)
Idaea illustris (Brandt, 1941)
Idaea mimetes (Brandt, 1941)
Idaea sanctaria Staudinger, 1900
Idaea sordida (Rothschild, 1913)
Isturgia disputaria (Guenée, 1858)
Lithostege fissurata Mabille, 1888
Microloxia ruficornis Warren, 1897
Neromia pulvereisparsa (Hampson, 1896)
Orthonama obstipata (Fabricius, 1794)
Palaeaspilates sublutearia (Wiltshire, 1977)
Pasiphila palaearctica (Brandt, 1938)
Phaiogramma discessa (Walker, 1861)
Pingasa lahayei (Oberthür, 1887)
Pseudosterrha rufistrigata (Hampson, 1896)
Rhodometra sacraria (Linnaeus, 1767)
Scopula adelpharia (Püngeler, 1894)
Scopula caesaria (Walker, 1861)
Scopula chalcographata Brandt, 1938
Scopula minorata (Boisduval, 1833)
Spiralisigna angusta Hausmann & Skou, 2008
Traminda mundissima (Walker, 1861)
Xanthorhoe wiltshirei (Brandt, 1941)
Zygophyxia relictata (Walker, 1866)

Gracillariidae
Phyllocnistis citrella Stainton, 1856

Nepticulidae
Acalyptris galinae (Puplesis, 1984)
Acalyptris gielisi van Nieukerken, 2010
Acalyptris repeteki (Puplesis, 1984)
Stigmella birgittae Gustafsson, 1985
Stigmella xystodes (Meyrick, 1916)

Noctuidae
Acontia biskrensis Oberthür, 1887
Acontia trimaculata Aurivillius, 1879
Agrotis sardzeana Brandt, 1941
Aucha polyphaenoides (Wiltshire, 1961)
Caradrina africarabica (Plante, 1997)
Drasteria kabylaria (Bang-Haas, 1906)
Eublemma siticuosa (Lederer, 1858)
Heteropalpia acrosticta (Püngeler, 1904)
Heteropalpia rosacea (Rebel, 1907)
Heteropalpia vetusta (Walker, 1865)
Oraesia intrusa (Krüger, 1939)
Plecoptera reflexa Guenée, 1852
Thiacidas postica Walker, 1855
Ulotrichopus tinctipennis (Hampson, 1902)

Nolidae
Churia gallagheri Wiltshire, 1985

Oecophoridae
Stathmopoda auriferella (Walker, 1864)
Stathmopoda bicolorella Koster, 2010
Stathmopoda ficivora Kasy, 1973
Tortilia pallidella Kasy, 1973

Pterophoridae
Agdistis nanodes Meyrick, 1906
Agdistis olei Arenberger, 1976
Agdistis qurayyahiensis Gielis, 2008
Agdistis tamaricis (Zeller, 1847)
Agdistis tenera Arenberger, 1976
Capperia celeusi (Frey, 1886)
Emmelina monodactyla (Linnaeus, 1758)
Megalorhipida leucodactylus (Fabricius, 1794)
Sphenarches anisodactylus (Walker, 1864)
Stenodacma wahlbergi (Zeller, 1852)
Stenoptilodes taprobanes (Felder & Rogenhofer, 1875)

Pyralidae
Acrobasis minutalis Asselbergs, 2008
Acteniopsis robustus Asselbergs, 2010
Aglossa aglossalis (Ragonot, 1892)
Ambluncus nervocellus Amsel, 1953
Ancylosis costistrigella (Ragonot, 1890)
Ancylosis lacteicostella (Ragonot, 1887)
Ancylosis nubeculella (Ragonot, 1887)
Ancylosis obscuripunctella Roesler, 1973
Ancylosis ochraceela Asselbergs, 2008
Arenipses sabella Hampson, 1901
Arsenaria caidalis (Hampson, 1900)
Arsenaria hyrcanalis (Amsel, 1951)
Asalebria adiudicata Asselbergs, 2008
Bazaria lixiviella (Erschoff, 1874)
Bazaria pempeliella Ragonot, 1893
Belutchistania squamalis Amsel, 1951
Canthelea safadalis Asselbergs, 2008
Ceutholopha isidis (Zeller, 1867)
Cherchera abatesella Dumont, 1932
Dalakia uniformella Amsel, 1961
Ditrachyptera verruciferella (Ragonot, 1888)
Epicrocis pseudodiscomaculella (Amsel, 1935)
Epiepischnia minimella Asselbergs, 2008
Epischnia albella Amsel, 1953
Etiella zinckenella (Treitschke, 1832)
Faveria cineracella (Amsel, 1953)
Faveria dionysia (Zeller, 1846)
Faveria tchourouma Amsel, 1961
Galleria mellonella (Linnaeus, 1758)
Hypotia birgita Asselbergs, 2008
Hypotia numidalis Hampson, 1900)
Isauria dilucidella (Duponchel, 1836)
Lamoria anella ([Denis & Schiffermüller], 1775)
Myelois quadripunctella Zerny, 1914
Neorastia albicostella Amsel, 1953
Paralaodamia ajbanica Asselbergs, 2008
Pempelia arida Asselbergs, 2008
Pempelia tchabaharella Amsel, 1950
Phycita arabica Asselbergs, 2008
Pseudosyria malacella (Staudinger, 1870)
Pyralis pictalis (Curtis, 1834)
Raphimetopus ablutella (Zeller, 1839)
Rungsina mimicralis (Amsel, 1951)
Saluria eremica Asselbergs, 2008
Scotomera gielisi Asselbergs, 2008
Scotomera minimalis (Amsel, 1949)
Staudingeria albifrontella Asselbergs, 2010
Staudingeria aspilatella (Ragonot, 1887)
Staudingeria partitella Ragonot, 1887
Susia uberalis (Swinhoe, 1884)

Tischeriidae
Tischeria ptarmica Meyrick, 1908

Tortricidae
Age onychistica Diakonoff, 1982
Ancylis sederana Chrétien, 1915
Bactra minima Meyrick, 1909
Bactra venosana (Zeller, 1847)
Crocidosema plebejana Zeller, 1847
Dasodis cladographa Diakonoff, 1983
Fulcrifera refrigescens (Meyrick, 1924)
Loboschiza koenigiana (Fabricius, 1775)
Ophiorrhabda cellifera (Meyrick, 1912)
Selania resedana (Obraztsov, 1959)

Xyloryctidae
Eretmocera bradleyi Amsel, 1961
Eretmocera impactella (Walker, 1864)
Scythris amplexella Bengtsson, 2002
Scythris cucullella Bengtsson, 2002
Scythris elachistoides Bengtsson, 2002
Scythris kebirella Amsel, 1935
Scythris nipholecta Meyrick, 1924
Scythris pangalactis Meyrick, 1933
Scythris parenthesella Bengtsson, 2002
Scythris valgella Bengtsson, 2002
Scythris valvaearcella Bengtsson, 2002

External links
AfroMoths

Lists of moths by country
Lists of moths of Asia
Moths

Moths